Chelsea Boys is an American comic strip created by Glen Hanson and Allan Charles Neuwirth, about the lives of three gay male roommates living in New York City's Chelsea district. The strip first began publication in 1998 in New York's Next magazine.

Stylistically, the strip is very much "of its time", reflecting the prevailing fashion for heaviness of line and a tendency to angularity. In terms of content and characterization, the strip bears some similarities to a 1970s and 1980s comic strip called Poppers, which was drawn by Jerry Mills, though both strips differ artistically.

Characters
Nathan: a 42-year-old widowed Jewish man. Nathan is portrayed as the "everyman" of the strip, is fairly short, and has a goatee. Though not made explicit, it appears from context that his late partner died of complications from AIDS. He also subsequently dated Steve, who worked in the World Trade Center and was killed in the September 11, 2001 terrorist attacks.
Soirée: a flamboyant African-American man around 30 years old. Performs as a drag queen. Soirée was thrown out of his parents' house for being gay when he was a teenager, although he later reconciled with some family members at his father's funeral. Soirée's real name is Delroy Monroe, though his real name is never used by himself or most of the other characters.
Sky: a 22-year-old Canadian art student. Sky, the son of hippie parents, grew up on a commune. He tends toward being extremely optimistic (if slightly naive), and is cartoonishly well-built, resulting in his attracting a lot of attention from others, although he is often unaware of how attractive he is to both men and women; the gang also once walked in on Sky having sex with his lesbian friend and classmate Annie after returning from the pride parade.
Miss Marmelstein: Nathan's pet dog, named after Barbra Streisand's character in the Broadway play I Can Get It for You Wholesale.
Richard: Nathan's best friend.
Ruben: Richard's boyfriend.
Annie: Sky's friend and classmate.
Kelvin Cohen: a vain clothing designer; parody of Calvin Klein. He was also a former classmate of Nathan's at Hebrew school.
Chris: Sky's boyfriend.
Curtis: Soirée's boyfriend, a successful lawyer.
Ricki and Lucie: a lesbian couple who live in Nathan, Soirée and Sky's apartment building. Nathan served as a sperm donor in one storyline so that the couple could have a child (named Lindsay).
Risa: or Reese for short, Nathan's sister who divorces her husband near the end of the comic strip's run. She has two sons, Jason and Justin.

Distribution

New York's Next magazine is the lead carrier for the strip, which is also syndicated throughout the United States, Canada, the United Kingdom, Spain and South Africa. Hanson and Neuwirth signed a deal in 2005 with Logo to develop a television animated series based on the strip, but after several months of development the network declined to move forward, citing budget concerns.

Strip compilations
 Chelsea Boys. published 2003 by Alyson Books.
 Chelsea Boys Steppin' Out!, published 2006 by Bruno Gmünder Books.

References

External links
Chelsea Boys' official website via Wayback Machine

1998 comics debuts
LGBT-related comic strips
American comic strips
Comic strips set in the United States
LGBT culture in the United States
Fictional gay males
Gag-a-day comics
Comics characters introduced in 1998
1990s LGBT literature
LGBT literature in the United States